Proxy Falls, also known as Lower Proxy Falls, is a cascade and plunge waterfall from a collection of springs on the shoulder of North Sister, that plunges into a gaping canyon near McKenzie Pass in the Willamette National Forest, near Belknap Springs, Oregon.

Description
Proxy Falls formed at the end of a hanging valley created by the canyons cut by glaciers 6,000 years ago. Proxy Falls and its neighbor, Upper Proxy Falls, plummet off glacier-cut cliffs surrounded by lava fields from cinder cones near North Sister that filled the valley floor. The water plunges into porous subsoil and sinks underground, giving the impression that there is no outlet on the surface.

Trails
An unpaved foot trail loops around lava fields and dense conifer forests with view points to Proxy Falls and the smaller Upper Proxy Falls. It starts at the trailhead off highway 242 and it totals 1.6 miles of easy hiking. The counterclockwise direction of the loop leads off to Proxy Falls, whereas on the opposite direction it leads to Upper Proxy Falls. Access to the base of Proxy Falls spins off the main trail and it requires crossing Proxy river. Upper Proxy Falls stem from an unnamed river in close proximity to Proxy creek.

See also 
 List of waterfalls in Oregon

References

Waterfalls of Lane County, Oregon
Willamette National Forest
Plunge waterfalls